Tasmanian Steamers Proprietary Limited was a company that operated passenger ferries across the Bass Strait from 1921 to 1959. It was jointly owned by the Union Steam Ship Company and Huddart Parker.

History

The company was formed on 22 December 1921. Its ships had many difficulties over the 38 years of operations, including World War II, when some of its ships had already been through World War I. In that war one of its ships, was a troopship for Australia and also New Zealand for a short time.

The company ceased passenger operations in 1959 when the Australian National Line took over.

Fleet

Streets in the Burnie suburbs of Shorewell Park and Malonga Park are named after the fleet.

References

Further reading

Links

Bass Strait ferries
Ferry companies of Tasmania
Ferry companies of Victoria (Australia)
Defunct shipping companies of Australia
History of transport in Tasmania
Australian companies established in 1921
1959 disestablishments in Australia